While railways in some states were briefly operated as private companies, railways of Australia have historically operated as Government instrumentalities.

The earlier form of a single state government railway department in each state no longer exists – with complex relationships developed by state and federal government corporations operating in multiple locations and across borders between states.

They are further divided into 'above' and 'below' rail companies – track owners, and train operators.  Some companies are both.

Track and Train
 Aurizon
 One Rail Australia (South Australian rural branch lines, Tarcoola-Darwin line)
 Metro Trains Melbourne (manager of suburban trackage owned by VicTrack)
 Queensland Rail
 TasRail
 V/Line (manages all Victorian track owned by VicTrack, except the suburban and interstate networks)

Track Only
 Arc Infrastructure (Western Australia)
 Australian Rail Track Corporation (interstate network)
 John Holland Rail (Country Regional Rail Network in New South Wales)
 Transport Asset Holding Entity of NSW (urban passenger lines in Sydney, Newcastle and Wollongong area, other New South Wales lines are controlled or maintained under contract by Australian Rail Track Corporation and John Holland Rail)
 VicTrack (owner of Victorian network)
 South Maitland Railway (New South Wales)

Train Only

Suburban
 Queensland Rail (City network)
 Sydney Trains
 Keolis Downer (Adelaide Metro)
 Transperth Trains
 Metro Trains Melbourne

Regional
 Journey Beyond
 NSW TrainLink
 Queensland Rail (Traveltrain)
 Transwa
 V/Line

Freight
 Bowmans Rail
 One Rail Australia
 Pacific National 
 Qube Logistics
 SCT Logistics
 Southern Shorthaul Railroad
 Watco Australia

Heavy Haul
 BHP
 Fortescue Metals Group
 Rio Tinto 
 Roy Hill

Tourist and Heritage
 List of heritage railways in Australia

Rolling stock hire
 Rail First Asset Management
 Consolidated Rail Leasing
 RailPower

Manufacturers
 Bombardier Transportation
 Downer Rail
 UGL Rail
 Alstom

See also
 Rail transport in Australia
 List of former Australian railway companies

External links
 Department of Infrastructure, Transport, Regional Development and Local Government: Organisation of Australia's Railways